Nikoloz Basilashvili was the defending champion but chose not to defend his title.

Robin Haase won the title after defeating Adam Pavlásek 6–4, 6–7(9–11), 6–2 in the final.

Seeds

Draw

Finals

Top half

Bottom half

References
 Main Draw
 Qualifying Draw

The Hague Open - Singles